"Cherry Blossom Girl" is a song by French electronic music duo Air. It was released in February 2004 by Virgin Records as the first single for their third studio album, Talkie Walkie (2004).

Content 

The song is the album's second track. Written in C-sharp minor, it opens up with bowed vibraphone, drum machines and fingerpicked acoustic guitar, which are soon joined by synthesizers and flute. The lyrics are sung by Jean-Benoît Dunckel.

Music video 

The music video was directed by adult film director Kris Kramski.

Track listing 

 7" vinyl and CD

 "Cherry Blossom Girl (Radio Mix)" – 3:43
 "Cherry Blossom Girl (Hope Sandoval Version)" – 2:53

 12" vinyl

 "Cherry Blossom Girl (Radio Mix)" – 3:43
 "Cherry Blossom Girl (Simian Mobile Disco Mix)" – 5:54
 "Fanny (CBG demo)" – 3:11

 French CD maxi single

 "Cherry Blossom Girl (Radio Mix)" – 3:43
 "Cherry Blossom Girl (Simian Mobile Disco Mix)" – 5:54
 "Cherry Blossom Girl (Danny Krivit Dub Remix)" – ?:??
 "Fanny (CBG Demo)" – 3:11

 EU/U.S. CD maxi single

 "Cherry Blossom Girl (Radio Mix)" – 3:43
 "Cherry Blossom Girl (Hope Sandoval Version)" – 2:53
 "Cherry Blossom Girl (Simian Mobile Disco Mix)" – 5:54
 "Fanny (CBG Demo)" – 3:11

Charts

References 

2004 singles
2004 songs
Air (French band) songs
Song recordings produced by Nigel Godrich
Songs written by Nicolas Godin
Songs written by Jean-Benoît Dunckel
Astralwerks singles
Virgin Records singles